Clément Noël (born 3 May 1997) is a French World Cup alpine ski racer and specialises in the slalom discipline. He competed in the 2018 Winter Olympics, placing fourth in the slalom, then became the gold medalist in slalom at the 2022 Winter Olympics.

Biography 
Noël is from the Remiremont commune in Vosges, in northeastern France.

In 2015, he joined the France B team and made his first World Cup debut in November 2016 at Levi, Finland. He became Champion of France of Slalom Elite with Lélex on March 26, 2017, and scored his first points in the World Cup by taking 20th place in the slalom at Val-d'Isère on December 10, 2017. He gained his first top ten by placing eighth in the slalom at Kitzbühel on 21 January 2018. A few weeks later, on 7 February, he won the slalom at the Junior World Championships at Davos, Switzerland.

Noël competed in his first Olympic Games at Pyeongchang in 2018 and just missed a medal, coming in fourth in the slalom. He gained his first World Cup podium eleven months later with a runner-up finish in the slalom at Adelboden  A week later he won his first race, a slalom in Wengen. At his first World Championships in February, he was seventh in the slalom.

Noël is a student at the University of Savoy.

World Cup results

Season standings

Race podiums

World Championship results

Olympic results

References

External links

 
 2023 men's A team at French Ski Team 
 Clement Noel at Dynastar Skis

1997 births
French male alpine skiers
Living people
Alpine skiers at the 2018 Winter Olympics
Alpine skiers at the 2022 Winter Olympics
Olympic alpine skiers of France
Medalists at the 2022 Winter Olympics
Olympic medalists in alpine skiing
Olympic gold medalists for France
Université Savoie-Mont Blanc alumni
Sportspeople from Vosges (department)